Kevin Wimmer (born 15 November 1992) is an Austrian professional footballer who plays as a centre back for Rapid Wien and the Austria national team.

Wimmer began his professional career with LASK where his performances earned him a move to German club 1. FC Köln in June 2012. In the 2013–14 season, Wimmer helped Köln set a new 2. Bundesliga record, conceding only 20 goals as they earned promotion to the Bundesliga. After a solid first season in the German top flight he moved to Premier League side Tottenham Hotspur for a fee of £4.3 million. However his playing time under Mauricio Pochettino at White Hart Lane was restricted due to the form of Toby Alderweireld and Jan Vertonghen. After two seasons in North London, Wimmer joined Stoke City in August 2017 for a fee of £18 million. He struggled for game time at Stoke and joined Hannover 96 on loan for the 2018–19 season, Belgian side Royal Excel Mouscron in 2019–20 and Karlsruher SC in 2020–21.

Club career

1. FC Köln
In June 2012, Wimmer moved from Austrian side LASK to German club 1. FC Köln for a €250,000 transfer fee. On 5 August 2012, he made his debut in a 1–0 loss to Eintracht Braunschweig. He went on to become a regular in Köln's defence. On 29 November 2013, Wimmer scored his first goal in a 3–0 win over FC St. Pauli.

In the 2013–14 season, Wimmer helped the club set a 2. Bundesliga record, conceding only 20 goals as they earned promotion to the Bundesliga. Wimmer continued his good performances in Germany's top division to help Köln stay in the Bundesliga, managing to avoid defeat against every team, save for Bayern Munich and SC Freiburg, at least once. The team played a Bundesliga record nine 0–0 draws, equalling Bayern Munich's 1966 Bundesliga record of not conceding a goal in 13 matches. In the 2014–15 season, Wimmer started 32 matches and was named the seventh-best defender in the league by football magazine Kicker.

Tottenham Hotspur
On 29 May 2015, Wimmer joined Premier League side Tottenham Hotspur on a five-year contract for a reported £4.3 million transfer fee. On 30 July, he made his Tottenham debut against the MLS All-Stars in a 2–1 defeat in Denver, Colorado. Wimmer replaced captain Jan Vertonghen after 45 minutes and made his debut alongside fellow new signings Dele Alli, Kieran Trippier and Toby Alderweireld.

On 4 August 2015, Wimmer made his first start for the club in a 2–0 defeat to Real Madrid in the Audi Cup, played in Munich, and was replaced by Jan Vertonghen after 46 minutes. Wimmer was limited to scant cup appearances and squad namings to start the season, mainly due to the strong central defense partnership between Vertonghen and Alderweireld. With a loan out of the club a potential possibility, manager Mauricio Pochettino elected to keep Wimmer, citing a need for depth in defense in case of an injury. Such an opportunity arose, as Wimmer finally got his breakthrough when he made his first league appearance of the 2015–16 Premier League season on 23 January 2016, coming on as a substitute for an injured Vertonghen in a 3–1 win over Crystal Palace. With Vertonghen ruled out for about two months, Wimmer was set for an extended run as his replacement in both the Premier League and the Europa League knockout stages. Wimmer impressed as Vertonghen's replacement, making 15 starts across all competitions before Vertonghen returned against Manchester United on 10 April. In the 9 league starts made by Wimmer, Tottenham only gave up six goals as they reached second place in the table. After the season, Wimmer signed a new five-year contract, keeping him at Tottenham until the summer of 2021.

Despite heading into the 2016–17 season with "different expectations" on the heels of his first season, Wimmer was once again on the bench to start the year, not helped by a preseason thigh injury. After telling the Austrian paper Kleine Zeitung in October that he was waiting "patiently for his chance", an injury to Toby Alderweireld opened up the door for Wimmer, but it was initially Eric Dier who took his spot at centre-back. A second injury was necessary for Wimmer to crack the lineup, and it was Dele Alli who suffered this time. Wimmer appeared for the first time in the Premier League that season on 6 November against bitter rivals Arsenal as the lone centre-back in a three-man back line that was used for the first time by manager Mauricio Pochettino that season. In the derby, Wimmer scored an own goal attempting to defend a whipping Mesut Özil free kick in a 1–1 draw.

Stoke City
Wimmer signed for Stoke City on 28 August 2017, for a fee of £18 million. Manager Mark Hughes said that "Bringing Kevin here is a real coup in my view, because he is a hugely talented young player who will undoubtedly add further quality to the group...There is a lot of money being spent this summer, so for us to get a player of Kevin’s calibre through the door for the price we have paid, in my opinion, is something we will really appreciate for years to come". He made his Stoke debut on 9 September 2017 in a 2–2 draw against Manchester United. Wimmer made a poor start to his Stoke career and came in for much criticism from supporters for his performance in a heavy defeat at Manchester City.

Wimmer's performances failed to improve and he was placed on a special fitness regime by new manager Paul Lambert. Wimmer failed to play at all under Lambert, as Stoke suffered relegation to the EFL Championship. Wimmer was branded a 'flop' by Stoke supporters and it was reported that the club would be willing to take a substantial loss on him in the summer. Wimmer joined Bundesliga club Hannover 96 on loan in May 2018 with the option of a permanent transfer. Wimmer played 24 games for Hannover as the side finished in 17th position and were relegated to the 2. Bundesliga. He did not play enough matches to trigger a permanent transfer.

On 31 August 2019, Wimmer joined Belgian Belgian First Division A side Royal Excel Mouscron on loan for the 2019–20 season. He made 18 appearances for Mouscron until the Belgian season was ended early in April 2020 due to the COVID-19 pandemic with Mouscron in 10th position.

On 1 February 2021, Wimmer joined German side Karlsruher SC on loan for the remainder of the 2020–21 season.

Rapid Wien
On 28 May 2021, it was announced that Wimmer had his contract with Stoke terminated so he was able to move to SK Rapid Wien on a free transfer.

International career
Wimmer has represented Austria at under-17, under-19, under-20 and under-21 levels.

On 15 November 2013, he made his senior debut for the  Austria national team in a friendly, coming on as a substitute in a 1–0 win over the United States.

He represented the national team at 2016 UEFA Euro.

Career statistics

Club

International

References

External links

Living people
1992 births
People from Wels
Footballers from Upper Austria
Association football defenders
Austrian footballers
Austria international footballers
Austria under-21 international footballers
Austria youth international footballers
UEFA Euro 2016 players
2. Liga (Austria) players
Bundesliga players
2. Bundesliga players
Regionalliga players
Premier League players
Belgian Pro League players
LASK players
1. FC Köln players
1. FC Köln II players
Tottenham Hotspur F.C. players
Stoke City F.C. players
Hannover 96 players
Royal Excel Mouscron players
SK Rapid Wien players
Austrian expatriate footballers
Austrian expatriate sportspeople in Germany
Expatriate footballers in Germany
Austrian expatriate sportspeople in England
Expatriate footballers in England
Austrian expatriate sportspeople in Belgium
Expatriate footballers in Belgium